Isamu Takashima was a Japanese rower. He competed in the men's coxed four event at the 1928 Summer Olympics.

References

External links

Year of birth missing
Year of death missing
Japanese male rowers
Olympic rowers of Japan
Rowers at the 1928 Summer Olympics
Place of birth missing